The following is a partial list of currently operating private schools in Scotland.

Many of the schools are perceived to be heavily influenced by the culture, practices and ethos of English independent, or "public", schools. Author James Robertson described Glenalmond College as "a Scottish boarding school modelled on the English public school system". The perceived English influence in many of these schools was such that in 1887 one author referred to them as "English schools". 43% of Scottish independent secondary schools offer boarding as an option, although there is more of a trend to attend as a day pupil compared to in England.

There are 102 independent schools across Scotland of which 72 are members of the Scottish Council of Independent Schools (SCIS). According to the SCIS, its members educate around 29–30,000 pupils in Scotland representing around 4.1% of the school age population in Scotland. The figure is significantly higher in Edinburgh, with around 1 in 4 pupils educated at an independent school, the highest proportion in the UK.

Scottish students from independent schools are over-represented at the four ancient universities of Scotland. They represented 26% of the student body at the four institutions in 2014/15 with 71% in total receiving an offer of admission at one of the four ancient universities compared to only 29% of state-school entrants.

List of schools

North

Albyn School, City of Aberdeen
Gordonstoun, Elgin, Moray
International School of Aberdeen, Milltimber, Aberdeenshire
Lathallan School, Johnshaven, Kincardineshire
Drumduan School, Forres
Robert Gordon's College, City of Aberdeen
St Margaret's School for Girls, City of Aberdeen

Central

Ardvreck School, Crieff
Balnacraig School, Perth
Belhaven Hill School, Dunbar
Cedars School of Excellence, Greenock (Pentecostal Christian school)
The Compass School, Haddington, East Lothian
Craigclowan Preparatory School, Perth
The Craighalbert Centre, Cumbernauld
Dollar Academy
Donaldson's College
Fairview International School, Bridge of Allan
Falkland House School, Falkland, Fife
Glenalmond College, Glenalmond
Good Shepherd Centre, Bishopton, Renfrewshire
Hamilton College
The High School of Dundee
Hillside School, Aberdour
Kibble Education & Care Centre, Paisley
Kilgraston School, Bridge of Earn
Lomond School, Helensburgh
Loretto School, Musselburgh
Moore House School, Bathgate
Morrison's Academy, Crieff
The New School, Dunkeld
New Struan School, Alloa
Oakwood School, Laurieston, Falkirk
Ochil Tower School, Auchterarder
Osborne House School, Dysart
Queen Victoria School, Dunblane
St. Columba's School, Kilmacolm
St Leonards School, St. Andrews
Starley Hall School, Burntisland
Strathallan School, Forgandenny
Sycamore School, Dunfermline

Edinburgh

Cargilfield Preparatory School
Clifton Hall School
The Edinburgh Academy
Erskine Stewart's Melville Schools
The Mary Erskine School
Erskine Stewart's Melville Junior School
Stewart's Melville College
Fettes College
George Heriot's School
George Watson's College
Mannafields Christian School
Merchiston Castle School
The Royal Blind School
Edinburgh Steiner School
St. George's School for Girls
St. Mary's Music School

Glasgow
 Belmont House School, Newton Mearns
 Fernhill School, Rutherglen
 Hutchesons' Grammar School, Pollokshields
 Craigholme School, Pollokshields
 Kelvinside Academy, Kelvinside
 The Glasgow Academy, Kelvinbridge
 The High School of Glasgow, Anniesland
 St. Aloysius' College Garnethill

South
 Daldorch House School (Autism), Catrine
 St. Mary's School, Melrose
 Wellington School, Ayr

Figures

Fees
The schools are ranked here by day school pupil fees for 2022/23 and boarding fees are given where applicable. In cases where the 2022/23 fees are not yet available, this is indicated next to the figures. For 2022/23, the mean average day fee was £16,530 (median average was £14,968) and the average boarding fee was £33,033. Membership of the Headmasters' and Headmistresses' Conference (HMC) is indicated, as well as the curriculum followed by the school: English (i.e. GCSEs, A-levels), Scottish (i.e. Standard Grades/Intermediates, Highers, Advanced Highers), Mixed English and Scottish, or International Baccalaureate (IB).

Exam results
Scottish Exams
The following table ranks the schools by performance in the 2008 round of Scottish Qualifications Authority examinations according to the percentage of A/B grades achieved at Higher level according to The Times newspaper. The percentage of 1 grades at Standard Grade and A grades at Intermediate 2 are also provided. As indicated above, some independent schools in Scotland follow the English curriculum or offer the International Baccalaureate.

Higher and Standard Grade/Intermediate 2 Results
Here, schools following the Scottish exam curriculum are ranked according to the percentage of Highers achieved in 2009 at A/B, as recorded in The Times.

Results of English Qualifications
The below schools follow the English exam curriculum, and are ranked according to the percentage of A-levels achieved at A*/A, as recorded in The Telegraph in 2015.

Results of International Baccalaureate
The below schools offer the International Baccalaureate as a qualification, and are ranked according to the average score achieved out of a maximum 45 points.

See also
List of schools in Scotland
Education in Scotland
List of UK Independent Schools
List of the oldest schools in the United Kingdom
Education Scotland

References

External links
The website UK Schools & Colleges Database lists currently operating state (and some independent) schools by Local Education Authority and also links to websites of individual schools where available.
Information on Private Schools in Scotland Key information and independent ratings on private Secondary Schools across Scotland.
 Scottish Schools Online Contact information and attainment data for independent Scottish schools.

Independent schools